Lewis McIlvride (26 January 1882 – 9 November 1949) was a New Zealand Member of Parliament and trade unionist.

Biography

Early life and career
McIlvride was born in Glasgow, Scotland, on 26 January 1882. He emigrated to Canada and was employed by the Canadian Pacific Railway company. In 1908 he left Canada and moved to New Zealand where he attained employment first with A. and G. Price of Thames, and later by the New Zealand Railways Department. In 1913 married Emily Jobe.

Political career

At the  election he stood as the Labour Party candidate in the  electorate, where he finished third. He then unsuccessfully contested the Patea by-election, a rural Taranaki seat, in 1921 as the Labour nominee. Of the three candidates, he came last with just under ten percent of the vote. While McIlvride polled a very small vote, he was the only one of the three candidates who increased the vote for his party compared with 1919.

McIlvride represented the  electorate in the New Zealand House of Representatives from 1922 to 1925 for the Labour Party.

Later life and death
After exiting Parliament he became the National Secretary of the Amalgamated Society of Railway Servants in 1927, succeeding Joe Mack, who had held that position since 1908. Later McIlvride also held office in the Amalgamated Society of Engineers.

McIlvride died in Wellington on 9 November 1949, aged 67.

Notes

References

1882 births
1949 deaths
New Zealand Labour Party MPs
New Zealand trade unionists
Scottish emigrants to Canada
Scottish emigrants to New Zealand
Politicians from Glasgow
People from Napier, New Zealand
New Zealand MPs for North Island electorates
Members of the New Zealand House of Representatives
Unsuccessful candidates in the 1919 New Zealand general election
Unsuccessful candidates in the 1925 New Zealand general election